East Los Streetscapers Public Art Studios is a muralist art collective and fine art studio based in East Los Angeles, California. Its members have executed over twenty murals and large-scale public artworks, primarily in the Los Angeles area.

History
East Los Streetscapers grew out of the Chicano Mural Movement of the 1960s and 1970s, a strand of muralism that "began as an arm of struggle of claiming urban space" for Chicanos.  It was founded by Wayne Alaniz Healy and David Rivas Botello in 1975.  Alaniz and Botello met in elementary school, and when in the third grade, collaborated on a mural. However, they lost touch when Botello's family moved to nearby City Terrace.

In 1969, Botello co-founded Goez Art Studio, "the first" Chicano art studio, with Jose Luis Gonzalez and Juan Gonzalez. In 1973, he painted Dreams of Flight, one of the early murals at Estrada Courts.

In 1968, Healy earned Bachelor's degrees in aerospace engineering and mathematics from Cal Poly Pomona. He went on to earn a Master's in mechanical engineering from the University of Cincinnati in 1973. He began working with Mechicano Art Center in East Los Angeles, and in 1974, painted the mural Ghosts of the Barrio at the Los Angeles housing project Ramona Gardens. He has since earned a Master's of Fine Arts from California State University, Northridge and created numerous screen prints with Self-Help Graphics & Art.

In 1975 Healy and Botello teamed to form Los Dos Streetscapers. They were soon joined by other artists such as George Yepes, Paul Botello, Rudy Calderon, Rich Raya, Ricardo Duffy, Charles Solares and Fabian Debora, which occasioned the renaming of the group to “East Los Streetscapers.” While collaborating artists have come and gone, Healy and Botello have remained the core of the group.

In 1990, Healy and Botello founded the Palmetto Gallery to provide exposure for younger artists, and East Los Streetscapers has also sponsored projects for barrio youth.

Artworks
The collective used acrylic paint as the primary medium for their early murals.  Later in the 1990s and 2000s they incorporated other media such as hand-painted tiles, cast bronze, and porcelain-enameled steel. Murals outside of Los Angeles include projects in San Jose, California, Santa Maria, California, Houston, Texas, St. Louis, Missouri, and Bellingham, Washington. Their work is characterized as "multicultural, strong, dynamic, colorful, site specific, and compositionally dramatic in line and texture."  

In a departure from acrylic and tile murals in 2002, Wayne Healy and East Los Streetscapers installed the 12-foot tall oxidized steel and dichroic glass public art sculpture Read, Reach, and Realize at the courtyard entrance to the Buena Vista Branch Library in Burbank, California.

Murals

See also
Arts and Culture of Los Angeles
Self Help Graphics & Art

Notes

References

External links 
East Los Streetscapers Official site

American artist groups and collectives
Culture of Los Angeles
Chicano art
Mexican-American culture in Los Angeles
American muralists
Arts organizations based in California
Arts organizations established in 1975
1975 establishments in California